Yevgeny Nikolayevich Misyulya (born March 13, 1964, in Grodna) is a Belarusian race walker. He has won two World Championships bronze medals, and even participated in the 2004 Summer Olympics at the age of 40. He is married to racewalker Natalya Misyulya.

Achievements

External links

1964 births
Living people
Belarusian male racewalkers
Athletes (track and field) at the 1988 Summer Olympics
Athletes (track and field) at the 1996 Summer Olympics
Athletes (track and field) at the 2004 Summer Olympics
Olympic athletes of Belarus
Olympic athletes of the Soviet Union
Sportspeople from Grodno
World Athletics Championships medalists
European Athletics Championships medalists
Goodwill Games medalists in athletics
CIS Athletics Championships winners
Soviet Athletics Championships winners
Competitors at the 1986 Goodwill Games
Soviet male racewalkers